Eat Your Makeup is a 1968 short film directed by John Waters, starring Marina Melin, Divine, Mary Vivian Pearce, David Lochary, Howard Gruber, and Maelcum Soul.

It was John Waters' first film production to be shot on 16mm film; his prior films were shot on 8mm stock.

The film has never been shown commercially, or released on home video. However, since 2004 it has been screened occasionally as part of various John Waters touring art exhibitions.

Plot
A deranged nanny (Maelcum Soul) kidnaps young girls and forces them to model themselves to death in front of her boyfriend (David Lochary) and their crazed friends. One of the spectators (Divine) fantasizes that he is Jackie Kennedy, and relives the JFK assassination in his mind.

Cast
Lizzy Temple Black as The Child Star
Divine as Jackie Kennedy
Howard Gruber as John F. Kennedy
David Lochary as Governess' boyfriend
Marina Melin as Head kidnapped model
Mona Montgomery as Kidnapped model
Mary Vivian Pearce as Kidnapped model
Maelcum Soul as Governess
Otts Munderloh as the Chauffeur
John Waters

See also
List of American films of 1968

External links

1968 films
American black-and-white films
Films directed by John Waters
1968 comedy films
1968 short films
Cultural depictions of John F. Kennedy
Cultural depictions of Jacqueline Kennedy Onassis
American comedy short films
1960s English-language films
1960s American films